Bucheon University is a private technical college in Bucheon City, Gyeonggi province, South Korea.  Although private, it has strong cooperative relationships with the Bucheon city government.  The school employs about 90 instructors, and offers instruction in fields such as construction, electronics, and management.

See also
List of colleges and universities in South Korea
Education in South Korea

References

External links
Official school website, in Korean

Universities and colleges in Gyeonggi Province
1979 establishments in South Korea
Educational institutions established in 1979